Standard Coltrane is an album by jazz musician John Coltrane released in October 1962 by Prestige Records. It was recorded at a single recording session at the studio of Rudy Van Gelder in Hackensack, New Jersey, in 1958. This album was rereleased in 1970 as The Master (PR 7825) with that version rereleased on CD to include the other four tunes recorded at the same 11 July session. Those other tunes had previously been released on two other albums assembled from unissued recordings (Stardust and Bahia).

Reception

In a review for AllMusic, Steve Leggett stated that the album is "more historical than vital or transitional, although it's pleasant enough."

The authors of The Penguin Guide to Jazz called the album "a low-intensity operation with the emphasis on ballads," and commented: "Harden's warm, unemphatic trumpet-playing is perfectly appropriate to the setting, and it rarely attempts anything that will scare the horses. He and the leader seem to have worked out the approach only rather notionally, and each of their improvisations has an informal, loose-limbed quality that is attractive but hardly dynamic."

Writing for Elsewhere, Graham Reid stated: "this is a safe entry point option on Coltrane and his confident, early Sixties style. Trumpeter Harlan matches him point-for-point but -- unlike what would come from the leader -- no boundaries are fully explored. That said, it is impossible to dislike the slightly clenched ballad 'Invitation' where you sense anything could happen in Coltrane's solo, but are pretty happy that it doesn't."

Track listing
 "Don't Take Your Love From Me" (Henry Nemo) – 9:17
 "I'll Get By" (Fred Ahlert, Roy Turk) – 8:12
 "Spring Is Here" (Lorenz Hart, Richard Rodgers) – 6:55
 "Invitation" (Bronislau Kaper, Paul Francis Webster) – 10:22

Personnel
 John Coltrane – tenor saxophone
 Wilbur Harden – trumpet, flugelhorn 
 Red Garland – piano
 Paul Chambers – bass  
 Jimmy Cobb – drums

References

1962 albums
John Coltrane albums
Prestige Records albums